Legoland Discovery Center Westchester is an indoor family entertainment center located at Westchester's Ridge Hill in Yonkers, New York in Westchester County. The attraction includes Lego rides, a play area, a 4D cinema and a gift shop. Legoland Discovery Center Westchester is owned and operated by leisure group Merlin Entertainments.

History
Lego bricks were invented by Danish carpenter Ole Kirk Kristiansen in 1958. The Lego employees were often interrupted by visitors who wanted to see what they could build with Lego bricks. So one day someone came up with the idea to build a park where visitors could build with the bricks. The first Legoland Discovery Center was opened in Berlin in 2007, and since then a total of 12 Legoland Discovery Centers have been opened. Legoland Discovery Center Westchester was opened in March 2013.

Rides & Attractions
 Lego Factory Tour where visitors can learn how LEGO bricks are made
 Lego 4D Cinema showing 4D films featuring popular LEGO characters throughout the day
 Kingdom Quest Laser Ride where visitors must zap the trolls and skeletons
 A lego replica of the local area in Miniland
 An area where visitors can build and test Lego Racers
 Merlin's Apprentice Ride where visitors can pedal to lift off the ground and look over the rest of Legoland Discovery Center Westchester
 Lego Fire Academy featuring a jungle gym, climbing wall, and slide
 Lego Construction Site featuring soft building bricks, a slide, and a crane cabin to sit in
 Lego Master Builder Academy offering classes with Legoland Discovery Center's Master Model Builders
 The Legoland Discovery Center Shop with over 900 products
 Duplo Village featuring a play slide, large animal models, and DUPLO bricks to build with
 Visitors can build a LEGO tower and test its strength on the Earthquake Tables
 Opportunity to meet the five Lego Friends- Stephanie, Olivia, Andrea, Mia, and Emma- build a LEGO microphone, and perform on the karaoke stage
 Visitors can add new builds to LEGO City and Heartlake City with the City Builder
 Café serving food, drinks and snacks
 Birthday Rooms for exclusive use as part of Legoland Discovery Center's Party Package

References

External links 
 

Legoland
Buildings and structures in Yonkers, New York
Tourist attractions in Westchester County, New York